Senator Eastman may refer to:

Dan Eastman (1948–2010), Utah State Senate
Enoch W. Eastman (1810–1885), Iowa State Senate
Enos Eastman (1821–1908), Wisconsin State Senate
H. E. Eastman (1819–1898), Wisconsin State Senate
John A. Eastman (1821–1895), Wisconsin State Senate
Nehemiah Eastman (1782–1856), New Hampshire State Senate